Mnematidium is a subgenus of Scarabaeus: in the Scarabaeidae or scarab beetles in the superfamily Scarabaeoidea.

References

Scarabaeidae